Thauvenay is a commune in the Cher department in the Centre-Val de Loire region of France.

Geography
The commune is one of 14 permitted to grow grapes for Sancerre AOC wine. The Vauvise flows northwest through the middle of the commune; the Loire forms part of its northeastern boundary.

Population

Sights
 A church dating from the twentieth century.
 A twelfth-century chapel.
 An eighteenth-century chateau.
 A restored public washhouse.

See also
Communes of the Cher department

References

External links

Website about Thauvenay 

Communes of Cher (department)